Jodoin is a surname. Notable people with the surname include:

Amable Jodoin (1828–1880), Canadian businessman and politician
Claude Jodoin (1913–1975), Canadian trade unionist and politician
Clément Jodoin (born 1952), Canadian ice hockey player
Florent Jodoin (1922–2008), Canadian cyclist
France Jodoin (born 1961), Canadian artist
Guy Jodoin (born 1966), Canadian comedian
Jean-Baptiste Jodoin (1809–1884), Canadian politician
Marianna Beauchamp Jodoin (1881–1980), Canadian politician
René Jodoin (1920–2015), Canadian animator and film producer
Sophie Jodoin (born 1965), Canadian artist